KSU is one of the oldest Polish punk rock bands, founded in 1977 in the southeastern town of Ustrzyki Dolne (in the Bieszczady Mountains). According to its creator, Eugeniusz Olejarczyk, creation of the band was the fruit of listening of radio stations from Western Europe, in which several punk rock songs were played. Young listeners from Ustrzyki decided to play covers of Black Sabbath, Deep Purple and Led Zeppelin, and in 1978 they came up with the name KSU, which comes from car licence plates, issued by the Krosno Voivodeship authorities for vehicles from Ustrzyki Dolne. With new name came new music - KSU began playing songs inspired by Sex Pistols, Damned, and UK Subs. 

In 1980, due to friendship with Kazimierz Staszewski, KSU travelled across Poland to Kolobrzeg, to participate in the New Wave Festival. The band was dubbed a sensation, but soon afterwards its members were one after one called up to the Polish Army and KSU ceased to exist. In 1988 KSU recorded an LP "Pod prąd" ("Against the flow"), which was warmly welcomed by its fans. 

Currently KSU consists of four members, including Olejarczyk. Its lyrics are in most cases written by Maciej Augustyn, the brother of former singer Bogdan "Bohun" Augustyn.

Members

Current line-up
 Eugeniusz Olejarczyk ("Siczka") – guitar, vocals
 Jarosław Kidawa ("Jasiu") – guitar, backing vocals
 Paweł Gawlik ("Kojak") – bass guitar
 Leszek Dziarek ("Dziaro") – drums, backing vocals, programming
 Piotr Leszega ("Piter") - guitar, backing vocals

Discography
 Pod prąd (1988)
 Ustrzyki (1990)
 Moje Bieszczady (1993)
 Na 15 lecie! (1994)
 Bez prądu (1995)
 21 (1999)
 Ludzie bez twarzy (2002)
 Kto cię obroni Polsko (2004)
 Nasze słowa (2005) POL No. 14
 Akustycznie XXX-lecie (2008) POL No. 21
Dwa Narody (2014)

Live albums

Video albums

References

Sources

Polish punk rock groups
Mystic Production artists